Frances E. Willard is a marble sculpture depicting the American educator, temperance reformer, and women's suffragist of the same name by Helen Farnsworth Mears, installed in the United States Capitol's National Statuary Hall, in Washington, D.C., as part of the National Statuary Hall Collection. The statue was gifted by the U.S. state of Illinois in 1905, making Willard the first woman to be honored in the Collection.

See also
 1905 in art

References

External links
 

1905 establishments in Washington, D.C.
1905 sculptures
Marble sculptures in Washington, D.C.
Monuments and memorials in Washington, D.C.
Monuments and memorials to women
Willard, Frances
Sculptures of women in Washington, D.C.